Naftali Herz Tur-Sinai (born 13 November 1886 – 17 October 1973) was a Bible scholar, author, and linguist instrumental in the revival of the Hebrew language as a modern, spoken language. Tur-Sinai was the first president of the Academy of the Hebrew Language and founder of its Historical Dictionary Project.

Biography
Naftali Herz Tur-Sinai was born Harry Torczyner in Lemberg, Galicia, Austria-Hungary (later Lwów, Poland, now Lviv, Ukraine) in 1886. He moved to Vienna, Austria, and then to Berlin, Germany in 1919 to be a lecturer at the Hochschule für die Wissenschaft des Judentums (College for Jewish Studies) in Berlin. He was in Palestine from 1910–1912 and participated in founding Gymnasia Rehavia in Jerusalem and Gymnasia Herzliya in Tel Aviv. He settled in Palestine in 1933. He was professor of Semitic languages at the Hebrew University of Jerusalem and a member of the Israel Academy of Sciences and Humanities.

He and Eliezer Ben-Yehuda are considered Israel’s two foremost philologists. Tur-Sinai's nephew, Jacques Torczyner, is a former president of the Zionist Organization of America.

Awards
 In 1940, Tur-Sinai was awarded the Bialik Prize for Jewish thought.
 In 1956, he was awarded the Israel Prize, for Jewish studies.
 In 1967, he received the Yakir Yerushalayim (Worthy Citizen of Jerusalem) award, the year of the award's inauguration.

Published works
Of his many books, those translated into English include The Revival of the Hebrew Language and The Book of Job: A New Commentary. He published a translation of the Tanakh from Hebrew into German. Of the Hebrew dictionary project begun by Eliezer Ben-Yehuda (Dictionary of the Ancient and Modern Hebrew Language), volumes 10-16 as well as the prolegomenon volume (המבוא הגדול) "were edited, updated, and completed" by Tur-Sinai, with the assistance of Dov Jarden, Meir Medan, and others. The sixteenth and final volume was released in 1958, 50 years after Ben Yehuda's first volume was published.

References

See also
List of Israel Prize recipients
List of Bialik Prize recipients

1886 births
1973 deaths
Writers from Lviv
Jews from Galicia (Eastern Europe)
Polish emigrants to Mandatory Palestine
Hebrew-language writers
Israel Prize in Jewish studies recipients
Academic staff of the Hebrew University of Jerusalem
Members of the Israel Academy of Sciences and Humanities
Modern Hebrew writers
Zionists
Translators of the Bible into German
Hebrew–German translators
20th-century translators
Linguists of Hebrew
Israeli Hebraists
Austro-Hungarian Jews
20th-century philologists
19th-century Polish Jews
20th-century Polish Jews
Israeli Jews